Sein Tu was a Burmese scholar and member of the Myanmar Arts and Sciences Academy. He graduated with a bachelor's degree in psychology at Rangoon University in 1950 and went to the United States for his graduate education. In 1952, he obtained a master's degree in education psychology at the Teachers College, Columbia University and in 1957, a Ph.D in social psychology at Harvard University.

He returned to Burma to teach psychology at Rangoon University and the University of Mandalay until his retirement in 1984.

References

University of Yangon alumni
Burmese scientists
Burmese scholars
People from Mandalay Region
Harvard University alumni
Teachers College, Columbia University alumni
1929 births
2007 deaths